George Albert Kasem (April 6, 1919 – February 11, 2002) was a U.S. Representative from California's 25th congressional district. He was of Lebanese descent and was the first Middle Eastern American elected to the United States Congress, serving one term from 1959 to 1961.

Early life
Born in Drumright, Oklahoma, Kasem was the son of Abdullah Kasem and Nabeha (Bader) Kasem.  His family moved to Los Angeles, California when he was a boy, and Kasem graduated from John H. Francis Polytechnic High School in 1938.  After graduation, Kasem worked as a clerk in a grocery store and became active in the local Retail Clerk's Union.

Military service
In 1941, he joined the United States Army Air Forces for World War II.  Kasem was trained as a weather observer and forecaster at military schools in Macon, Georgia and Grand Rapids, Michigan.  He served in Sudan, Egypt, and Iraq, and remained in the service until being discharged at the end of the war in 1945.

Post-World War II
He graduated from the University of Southern California in Los Angeles, California in 1949, and received his law degree from USC in 1951.  Kasem was admitted to the bar and became an attorney in Baldwin Park.

Member of Congress
Kasem was elected as a Democrat to the Eighty-sixth Congress (January 3, 1959 – January 3, 1961).  He was an unsuccessful candidate for re-election to the Eighty-seventh Congress in 1960.  During his term, Kasem advocated enhanced funding of the San Gabriel Valley Flood Control project, increased federal aid to education, and improved medical care for the elderly.  He caused controversy while on a visit to Beirut, when he gave a speech in which he indicated that the creation of and support for Israel was the most effective way to bring about peace in the Middle East.

Later career
After leaving Congress, Kasem resumed the practice of law.  He served as commissioner in Citrus Municipal Court, West Covina, California from 1978 to 1984.

He died in Carlsbad, California.

Family
Kasem was survived by his wife Catherine, to whom he was married for 54 years.  They were the parents of a daughter, Janet Orr, and had two grandchildren.

See also
 List of Arab and Middle Eastern Americans in the United States Congress

References

External links

George A. Kasem at The Political Graveyard

1919 births
2002 deaths
20th-century American politicians
American politicians of Lebanese descent
California lawyers
Deaths from pneumonia in California
Democratic Party members of the United States House of Representatives from California
John H. Francis Polytechnic High School alumni
People from Creek County, Oklahoma
Politicians from Los Angeles
Military personnel from California
United States Army Air Forces personnel of World War II
USC Gould School of Law alumni
20th-century American lawyers
United States Army Air Forces soldiers